Gats is a surname. Notable people with the surname include:

Carlos Gats (born 1969), Argentinian Olympic sprint runner